Manglish is a 2014 Indian Malayalam-language action comedy film directed by Salam Bappu, and the features Mammootty and Dutch actress Caroline Bech in the lead.

The film is produced by Haneef Muhammed under the banner of Red Rose Creations. Manglish is the first Malayalam film to be released in Dolby Atmos. 
The film is released on 25 July 2014 during the occasion of Eid-ul Fitr.Later the film was dubbed into Telugu as Malik Bhai.

Mammootty plays Malik Bhai, a wholesale fish auctioneer in Mattancherry market. An English lady, Michelle (Caroline Bech), arrives seeking help but the two have confusion in communicating with others. Manglish is a portmanteau, of Malayalam and English, used in popular culture of Kerala for speaking Malayalam incorporated with the English language.

Cast

Mammootty as Malik Bhai
Caroline Bech as Michelle
Srinda Ashab as Mumtaz
Alexx O'Nell as Kevin
Tini Tom as  Boss
Vinay Forrt as  Dixon    
Suresh Krishna as Lakshman
P.Balachandran as Krishna Swami
Sunil Sukhada as  Anglo Charlie
Joju George as Luckochan
Sathaar as Paulose Punnookaaran
Raveendran as  Pothen
Sasi Kalinga as  Mathukutty
Ramu as  Sulaiman Haji
Sudheer Karamana as Jahangir
 Aneesh G Menon as Simmon
Kalabhavan Haneefa as Chayakaran Mani
Gopan as H.C Chandran
 Kalabhavan Rahman as Driver Rahman
Mukundan as Adv. James
Pauly Valsan as Veronica
Sreedhanya as Seenath
Sheelu Abraham as Lalitha
Sudhi Koppa as Sahadevan
Kalabavan Sinaj as Thoppumpadi Sathyan
Chembil Ashokan as Union Leader
Ullas Pandalam as  Lorry driver

Soundtrack

Release
The film was released across Kerala on 27 July 2014. The film grossed ₹3.15 crore in around 5 days.

References

External links 
 

2014 films
Films shot in Kochi
2010s Malayalam-language films